Scranton is a hamlet in the town of Hamburg in Erie County, New York, United States. It is named after the city of Scranton, Pennsylvania.

References

Hamlets in New York (state)
Hamlets in Erie County, New York